Dabar (דָּבָר) is a Hebrew word that means "word", "talk" or "thing".

Dabar may also refer to:

Dabar (river), a river in the Bosanska Krajina region of Bosnia and Herzegovina
Dabar (župa), an administrative unit of the medieval principality of Zahumlje, in present-day Bosnia and Herzegovina
Eparchy of Dabar, a medieval diocese of the Serbian Orthodox Church in the region of Dabar
Metropolitanate of Dabar-Bosna, a modern diocese of the Serbian Orthodox Church]
Dabar, Lika-Senj County, a village in Croatia near Otočac
Dabar, Split-Dalmatia County, a village in Croatia near Hrvace
An historic region of medieval Serbia around the city of Priboj

See also
 
 Dabara
 Dabardan (disambiguation)